Area code 664 in a telephone area code in the North American Numbering Plan (NANP) for Montserrat, a British Overseas Territory in the Caribbean. The digits of the area code translate to MNI in the alphanumeric mapping on telephone dials.
The area code was created in a split of area code 809, which began permissive dialing 1 July 1996 and ended 1 June 1997.

A local call within Montserrat is dialed with seven digits. A call from another North American Numbering Plan country (such as the United States or Canada) requires dialing the long-distance acces code (1) the NPA code and the seven-digit phone number.

At one time the small island of Montserrat used only using four-digit phone numbers internally, as the first three digits after the former 809 area code were the same for everyone (491). As of May 2011, Montserrat has seven-digit numbers beginning with 236, 349, 410, 411, 412, 413, 415, 491, 492, 493, 494, 495, 496, 664, and 724.

See also
Area codes in the Caribbean

External links
North American Numbering Plan Administrator

664
Communications in Montserrat